Brożec may refer to the following places in Poland:
Brożec, Lower Silesian Voivodeship (south-west Poland)
Brożec, Opole Voivodeship (south-west Poland)